Onyinyechi Salome Zogg (born 3 March 1997) is a footballer who plays as a defender for Swiss Women's Super League club FC Zürich. Born in Switzerland, she represents Nigeria at international level.

Early life
Zogg was born and raised in Bern. Her father is Swiss and her mother is Nigerian.

College career
Zogg has attended the Monroe College in the United States.

Club career 
Zogg has played for BSC Young Boys, Femina Kickers Worb, FC Bethlehem and Zürich in Switzerland.

International career
Zogg made her senior debut for Nigeria on 10 June 2021 in a 0–1 friendly loss to Jamaica.

References

External links 

1997 births
Living people
Citizens of Nigeria through descent
Nigerian women's footballers
Women's association football defenders
Monroe Mustangs women's soccer players
Nigeria women's international footballers
Nigerian expatriate women's footballers
Nigerian expatriate sportspeople in the United States
Expatriate women's soccer players in the United States
Nigerian people of Swiss descent
People of Swiss-German descent
Footballers from Bern
Swiss women's footballers
BSC YB Frauen players
FC Zürich Frauen players
Swiss Women's Super League players
Swiss expatriate women's footballers
Swiss expatriate sportspeople in the United States
Swiss people of Nigerian descent
Swiss sportspeople of African descent
1. FFC Turbine Potsdam players
Nigerian expatriate sportspeople in Germany
Swiss expatriate sportspeople in Germany
Expatriate women's footballers in Germany
Swiss expatriate sportspeople in France
Nigerian expatriate sportspeople in France
Expatriate women's footballers in France